Xanthohumol is a natural product found in the female inflorescences of Humulus lupulus, also known as hops. This compound is also found in beer and belongs to a class of compounds that contribute to the bitterness and flavor of hops. Xanthohumol is a prenylated chalconoid, biosynthesized by a type III polyketide synthase (PKS) and subsequent modifying enzymes.

Biosynthesis 
Xanthohumol is a prenylated chalconoid derived from a plant type III PKS, and is synthesized in the glandular trichromes of hop cones. L-Phenylalanine serves as the starting material, which is converted to cinnamic acid by the PLP-dependent phenylalanine ammonia lyase. Cinnamic acid is oxidized by cinnamate-4-hydroxylase and loaded onto Coenzyme A (CoA) by 4-coumarate CoA ligase to yield 4-hydroxy-cinnamoyl CoA, the starter unit for PKS extension. This molecule is extended three times with malonyl CoA, cyclized through a Claisen condensation, and aromatized through tautomerization to form naringenin chalcone (chalconaringenin). This intermediate has the potential to form a variety of different products depending on the enzymes that modify the core structure. In the case of xanthohumol, a prenyltransferase called Humulus lupulus prenyltransferase 1 (HlPT-1) attaches a molecule of dimethylallyl pyrophosphate from the DXP pathway. HlPT-1 has a broad substrate specificity and also participates in making other prenylated flavonoids in the hop plant. Finally, an O-methyltransferase methylates a phenol substituent using S-adenosyl methionine. Total syntheses of xanthohumol and derivatives have been achieved, though extraction from hops remains a primary source.

Beer 
In commercial beers, the concentration of xanthohumol ranges from about 2 μg/L – 1.2 mg/L. During the brewing process, xanthohumol and other prenylated flavonoids are lost as they are converted to the corresponding flavanones. Different hop varieties and different beers contain varying quantities of xanthohumol.

Research

Xanthohumol is under basic research for its potential biological properties. Xanthohumol can be extracted with pressurized hot water.

See also 
 Isoxanthohumol, the corresponding prenylated flavanone
 8-Prenylnaringenin, a related prenylflavanoid with anti-estrogenic activity
 Alpha acids, a class of bitter compounds in hops
 Myrcene, humulene, and caryophyllene, essential oils in hops

References 

Chalconoids
O-methylated natural phenols
Humulus